The 2023 UK & Ireland Greyhound Racing Year is the 98th year of greyhound racing in the United Kingdom and Ireland.

Roll of honour

Principal UK finals

Principal Irish finals

Calendar

References 

Greyhound racing in the United Kingdom
Greyhound racing in the Republic of Ireland
UK and Ireland Greyhound Racing Year
UK and Ireland Greyhound Racing Year
2023 in greyhound racing